The Leesville Daily Leader is a daily newspaper published three days per week in Leesville, Louisiana, United States. It is owned by GateHouse Media.

The paper covers the city of Leesville and Vernon Parish. It is published on Wednesdays, Fridays and Sundays.

External links
 
 GateHouse Media

Newspapers published in Louisiana
Vernon Parish, Louisiana
Publications established in 1898
1898 establishments in Louisiana